Solør is a Norwegian traditional district consisting of the valley between Elverum in the north and Kongsvinger in the south. It is part of Innlandet county and it includes the municipalities Våler, Åsnes, and Grue.

Glomma valley 
Glommadal (Glåmdalen) is a designation for the valley formed by the river Glåma (also called the Glomma), which is the longest and largest river in Norway. From Lake Aursund in the north  on south to Elverum, the valley is called the Østerdalen. From that point south until Kongsvinger, it is referred to as  Solør. As in turns westerly from Kongsvinger until Nes, it is called the Odalen. These designations are also traditional districts, reflecting the designations locals used for their valleys.

Name

Geography
Solør is a rural area and consists mainly of farming land and forest. In fact, Solør is the number one potato producing area in Norway. Forestry is also important for the area, and "Forestia", a major chip-board factory, is situated in Våler, playing an important role in the local society, especially by providing jobs for a large proportion of the local inhabitants.

History
In the early Viking Age, before Harald Fairhair, Solør was a petty kingdom. In the 17th century the forest east of Glomma became known as Finnskogen ("the forest of the Finns"). This named refers to Finnish refugees from Sweden who had been encouraged to settle in the adjacent province of Värmland but were later evicted and fled across the border into Hedmark.

Halfdan Hvitbeinn was one of the historic Kings of Soløyjar (Solør).

References

Districts of Innlandet
Petty kingdoms of Norway